The ramped craft logistic (RCL) is a type of landing craft operated by 17 Port and Maritime Regiment RLC of the Royal Logistic Corps of the British Army. From the early 1980s onwards it was deployed to replace the RPL (ramped powered lighter). One of their first roles was to provide logistical support during the setting up of the garrison in the Falkland Islands immediately after the Falklands War - this role was conducted by the two first of class, Arromanches and Antwerp, later stationed at the military port at Marchwood, near Southampton, RCLs were originally procured for UK, Cyprus and Hong Kong. The two  based at the British base at Akrotiri, Cyprus, Andalsnes and Akyab were operated as 417 Troop of 17 Port and Maritime Regiment RLC. They were sold in 2014

Ferguson Transport and Shipping bought four members of the class and fitted them with Epsilon hydraulic cranes for commercial work, principally around the west coast of Scotland.

Fleet list
There were 9 ramped craft logistic brought into service:

References

Bibliography

"Defence Standard 00-3/Issue 3- Design Guidance For The Transportability Of Equipment", 27 May 1985, UK Ministry of Defence
British Army website RCL page  
Gallery of army landing craft: http://www.rfanostalgia.org/gallery3/index.php/RFA-AMPHIBIOUS/Army/Army-Landing-Craft

Ship types
Landing craft
British Army equipment
Royal Logistic Corps